The 1940 Utah gubernatorial election was held on November 5, 1940. Democratic nominee Herbert B. Maw defeated Republican nominee Don B. Colton with 52.07% of the vote.

Primary elections
Primary elections were held on September 3, 1940.

Republican primary

Candidates
Don B. Colton, former U.S. Representative
Reed Stevens
J. Bracken Lee, Mayor of Price
William J. Lowe
Otto A. Wiesley

Results

General election

Candidates
Major party candidates
Herbert B. Maw, Democratic
Don B. Colton, Republican 

Other candidates
Ada Williams Quinn, Independent

Results

References

1940
Utah
Gubernatorial